This Could Be the Night is a 1957 MGM comedy-drama film directed by Robert Wise and starring Jean Simmons and Paul Douglas. Anthony Franciosa made his debut in the film, which is based on the short stories by Cornelia Baird Gross.

Plot
Anne Leeds is a school teacher with only four weeks of experience. She takes a part-time job as a secretary to an ex-bootlegger and horse-playing gambler by the name of Rocco. He's a Broadway nightclub owner with a heart of gold who falls in love with Anne. However, he knows he's too old for her, so keeps his feelings to himself.

Anne "thinks" she's in love with his younger partner Tony Armotti, a typical playboy type who is afraid to fall in love because it might mean marriage. Tony lives in a walkup apartment above the nightclub, where he often entertains beautiful women. The stairs to the apartment are on the alley behind the club.

The entire nightclub loves Anne but Tony resents her because he wants to take care of her and protect her. Eventually after confronting Tony, Anne quits because Tony tells her he does not love her and never will. After she quits the entire nightclub patronizes Tony over whether Anne quit or was fired. He goes to where she is currently working and, after helping her escape when police raid the gambling den, convinces her to take back the job she quit.

Cast
 Jean Simmons as Anne Leeds
 Paul Douglas as Rocco
 Anthony Franciosa as Tony Armotti
 Julie Wilson as Ivy Corlane
 Neile Adams as Patsy St. Clair
 Joan Blondell as Crystal St. Clair
 J. Carrol Naish as Leon
 Rafael Campos as Hussein Mohammed
 ZaSu Pitts as Mrs. Katie Shea
 Tom Helmore as Stowe Devlin
 Murvyn Vye as Waxie London
 Vaughn Taylor as Ziggy Dawit
 Frank Ferguson as Mr. Shea
 Chuck Berry (cameo appearance)
 June Blair as chorus girl
 Bess Flowers as nightclub extra

Soundtrack
The soundtrack to the film was jazz-based, featuring performances by Ray Anthony and his Orchestra, with vocals throughout, including the film's title song, sung by Julie Wilson. Both Wilson and Anthony had roles in the film. Wilson played singer Ivy Corlane, while Anthony, with his Orchestra, played himself.

Reception
According to MGM records the film earned $870,000 in the US and Canada, and $650,000 elsewhere, resulting in a loss of $804,000.

See also
 List of American films of 1957

References

External links
 
 
 
 

1957 films
1957 comedy-drama films
American comedy-drama films
American black-and-white films
1950s English-language films
Films directed by Robert Wise
Films set in New York City
Metro-Goldwyn-Mayer films
Films produced by Joe Pasternak
1957 comedy films
1957 drama films
CinemaScope films
1950s American films
Films set in nightclubs
Films about educators